Sam Vogel, also known by his stage name Jauz, is an American DJ and electronic dance music producer based in San Francisco, United States. He founded his own record label, Bite This, in 2017.

Early life 
Vogel grew up in Northern California. He began playing guitar and producing electronic music on his computer at the age of 15. He went to Icon Collective music production school. He previously went to a film school in Loyola Marymount University where he joined Kappa Sigma before deciding to pursue a musical career, prompting him to enroll in Icon Collective. He began releasing future house tracks before adopting the stage name Jauz. His career kickstarted when fellow musician Kennedy Jones had played one of his remixes. Jones also had introduced him to his manager, Moe Shalizi which helped Vogel to release music on Borgore's record label, Buygore.

Musical style 
Vogel produces chill trap, bass house and dubstep. He also incorporates heavy bass sounds similar to the styles in the 80s and 90s. Vogel uses Ableton as his digital audio workstation.

Career

2013 
Before starting his professional career, he used "Escape Dubstep" as a stage name. He later used 'Jauz' because he thought it was short, simple and catchy despite hating the word. The name was also described by Vogel as a slang word for 'bullshit' and a liar. He started his career by uploading remixes. His songs caught the attention of well-known DJs such as Diplo, Skrillex and Borgore.

2014 
He released the single "Feel the Volume" via Diplo's record label, Mad Decent.

2015 
He collaborated with Skrillex to release the single "Squad Out!" as part of a program. He also released songs on Monstercat and Spinnin' Records. In December 2016, he collaborated with Diplo to remix MØ's song, "Final Song".

2017 
In 2017, he released singles "Claim to Be", "The Game", "I Hold Still", "Alpha" and "Ghost".

He also founded the record label Bite This on November 6, 2017.

Discography 

 The Wise and the Wicked (2018)

References 

American electronic musicians
American DJs
Jewish American musicians
People from San Francisco
Dubstep musicians
Spinnin' Records artists
Living people
1993 births
Monstercat artists
Mad Decent artists
Electronic dance music DJs
Twitch (service) streamers
21st-century American Jews